Tianqing (天慶) was a Chinese era name used by several emperors of China. It may refer to:

Tianqing (1029–1030), or Cheongyeong, era name used by Dae Yeon-rim
Tianqing (1111–1120), era name used by Emperor Tianzuo of Liao
Tianqing (1194–1206), era name used by Emperor Huanzong of Western Xia

See also
Tian Qing (born 1986), Chinese badminton player